Choa Saidan Shah  (Punjabi), is a town and Tehsil of Chakwal District in the Punjab Province of Pakistan. It is the capital and of one of the seven Union Councils of Choa Saidan Shah Tehsil.

Geography
The town is placed in a bowl shaped valley, surrounded by hills. It is surrounded by trees and orchards, and is famous for its roses and perfumes.

History
This town is named after the saint Saidan Shah Shirazi. The legend goes that the area was a desert until the holy man arrived, when he struck the ground with his staff and sweet water sprang up ("Choa" چوآ Punjabi means "spring"). The saint's shrine is set back from the main bazaar in a courtyard, and the annual urs is held in April.

Wildlife

Wild boar
It is commonly seen in hilly areas of town and used for Big trophy Hunting. The hunt is widely done by Catch dogs which people of this area love to adopt. Natives also hunt boar because they damage to crops like wheat, maize, barley and sunflowers. It is also many programs arranged in which people bought their dogs and fight it on Boar with great Physical Ability.

Hare
The hares are widely seen in fields and mountains of this valley. Hare hunting is widely in this Area. Hunters use special trained dogs which have great physical endurance and extreme quickness. People also uses rifles for hunting. Main reason for hunting is to eat its meat. It is usually hunted in moonlight in first 14 days of Islamic Calendar.

Yellow throated Marten
The yellow-throated marten is also known as the kharza, and is the largest marten in the Old World, with the tail making up more than half its length. Its fur is brightly colored, consisting of a unique blend of black, white, golden-yellow and brown. It is an omnivore, whose sources of food range from fruit and nectar to small deer. The yellow-throated marten is a fearless animal with few natural predators, because of its powerful build, its bright coloration and unpleasant odor. It shows little fear of humans or dogs, and is easily tamed. People had rarely seen this animal in mountain. Only some Locals had seen this specie.

Punjab Urial
Urial of this kind is seen and hunted in Steeps mountains of this area. Urial males have large horns, curling outwards from the top of the head turning in to end somewhere behind the head; females have shorter, compressed horns. The horns of the males may be up to 100 cm (39 in) long. The shoulder height of an adult male urial is between 80 and 90 cm (31 and 35 in). Many locals pet this also.

Indian Pangolins
The beautiful type of this unique specie is widely seen in grounds of Choa Saiden Shah. Pangolins have large, protective keratin scales covering their skin; they are the only known mammals with this feature. They live in hollow trees or burrows, depending on the species. Pangolins are nocturnal, and their diet consists of mainly ants and termites, which they capture using their long tongues. They tend to be solitary animals, meeting only to mate and produce a litter of one to three offspring, which are raised for about two years.

Crested porcupine
The more common name for this species is the crested porcupine. The adult crested porcupine has an average head and body length around 60 to 83 cm (24 to 33 in) long, discounting the tail, and weighs from 13 to 27 kg (29 to 60 lb).

Almost the entire body is covered with bristles which are either dark brown or black and rather coarse. This mammal is recognizable by the quills that run along the head, nape, and back that can be raised into a crest, hence the name crested porcupine. Also, some sturdier quills which are about 35 cm (14 in) in length run along the sides and back half of the body. These sturdier quills are used, for the most part, for defense and are usually marked with light and dark bands which alternate; these are not firmly attached. This porcupine has a shorter tail which has rattle quills at the end. The rattle quills broaden at the terminal end and the broad portion is hollow with thin walls. When these quills are vibrated, they produce a hiss-like rattle.

The front feet of the crested porcupine have four developed and clawed digits with a regressed thumb, the rear feet have five. The paws have naked and padded soles and have a plantigrade gait. The ears are external and both the eyes and ears are very small with long vibrissae on its head. The skull is specific in many ways; first, the infraorbital foramen is greatly enlarged so portions of the masseter extend through it and attach from the frontal side surface of the snout. Second, the angular process is inflected on the lower jaw, and third, the nasal cavity is enlarged. Prominent pockets create enlarged areas of attachment for chewing muscles. Collar bones are very much reduced, and one incisor, one premolar and three molars are present in each quadrant.

References

Populated places in Chakwal District
Union councils of Chakwal District